This is an alphabetical list of countries by past and projected gross domestic product per capita, based on official exchange rates, not on the purchasing power parity (PPP) methodology. Values are given in USDs and have not been adjusted for inflation. These figures have been taken from the International Monetary Fund's World Economic Outlook (WEO) Database (October 2022 edition), World Bank, or various sources.

IMF estimates between 1980 and 1989

IMF estimates between 1990 and 1999

IMF estimates between 2000 and 2009

IMF estimates between 2010 and 2019

IMF projections for 2020 through 2027

CIA estimates in 1990
GDP (Nominal) per Capita data in 1990, with some countries only GNP (Nominal) was provided by the CIA World Factbook.

UN estimates between 1970 and 1979
The following Table is based from UN data.

UN estimates between 1980 and 1989

UN estimates between 1990 and 1999

UN estimates between 2000 and 2009

UN estimates between 2010 and 2019

Centre for Economics and Business Research estimate for 2035
The following table is a nominal GDP per capita estimate for the top 20 largest economies in 2035 made by British think tank Centre for Economics and Business Research in December 2020. Total GDP figures have been divided by UN population projections for the year 2035.

Other sources 1965
GDP (nominal) per capita in 1965 based on a West-German school book (published in 1971).

Sources
International Monetary Fund (IMF), World Economic Outlook (WEO) database, October 2021 edition, gross domestic product (nominal) per capita, current prices, (millions of) U.S. dollars.

References

External links
IMF
October 2022 World Economic Outlook (WEO) Database
Archive of the WEO databases, from 1999 to 2011

GDP (nominal)